Autopsy Torment is a Swedish death metal band, formed in 1989. The band was started by Thomas Karlsson, Autopsy Torment's frontman and singer, with Onkel on guitars. In 1991, the band became a trio with Karl Vincent (Sexual Goatlicker) on drums and Daniel Nilsen on guitar who wrote and recorded the demo Darkest Rituals that same year. Then followed a period of constant personnel changes, with Thomas Karlsson and Karl Vincent as the core members.

In 1992, the band split up and Karlsson started black metal band Pagan Rites, later becoming the vocalist for the doom band Tristitia. In 1999, the 1991 line-up re-formed with the addition of The Demon on bass as a result of Daniel and The Demon writing some new songs and after talking with Karlsson they decided to reform Autopsy Torment to work on and release new material. The band released the album Orgy with the Dead on Miriquidi Productions in 2002 and the follow-up album Tormentorium on Painkiller Records in 2003. Karlsson is still actively working with his own project, Devil Lee Rot, and with Pagan Rites. Pulverized Records released an Autopsy Torment compilation album named 7th Ritual for the Darkest Soul of Hell in 2008 containing the demos Darkest Rituals, The Seventh Soul of Hell and Moonfog EP-sessions, all originally released in 1992.

The Compilation album 7th Ritual for the Darkest Soul of Hell was mastered in Unisound Studio by Dan Swanö, most known for being the founding member of the Swedish progressive death metal band Edge of Sanity as well as playing in a long list of other bands. The cover design for the album was created by the well respected artist Chris Moyen.

Members

Current lineup
Thomas Karlsson – vocals
(The rest of the line-up is currently unknown)

Former members
The Demon – bass
Daniel Nilsen – guitar
David "Slaughter" Stranderud – guitar
Karl Vincent (Sexual Goat Licker) – drums
Onkel – guitars (first demo)
Thomas Hedlund – drums

Thomas Hedlund is not the same person that plays in Cult of Luna.

Discography
 Jason Lives (Demo, 1989)
 Splattered (Demo, 1990)
 Darkest Rituals (Demo, 1991)
 Moon Fog (EP, 1992)
 Advanced Tape (Demo, 1992)
 Nocturnal Blasphemy (Demo, 1992)
 The Seventh Soul Of Hell (Demo, 1992)
 Orgy with the Dead (LP, 2001)
 Darkest Rituals (EP, 2002)
 Premature Torment/Pagan From The Heat (Split with Devil Lee Rot, 2003)
 Tormentorium (LP/CD, 2003)
 Graveyard Creatures (LP, 2005)
 7th Ritual for the Darkest Soul Of Hell (Digi-CD, 2008)

External links
 Official website

Swedish thrash metal musical groups
Musical groups established in 1989
Swedish death metal musical groups